DSY may refer to:

 Dassault Systèmes, a French software company
 Daisy Hill railway station, Greater Manchester, England (National Rail station code: DSY)